Nikitas Venizelos (July 1930 – 12 February 2020) was a Greek shipping magnate and politician who ran Venezelos SA.

He was involved also in politics. In the 1980s, he attempted a revival of the original liberal party, under the same name, while in the 1990s he supported the Political Spring party and Antonis Samaras.

References

1930 births
2020 deaths
Greek businesspeople in shipping
Greek politicians
Nikitas
Politicians from Athens
Businesspeople from Athens